In the mathematical area of order theory, a completely distributive lattice is a complete lattice in which arbitrary joins distribute over arbitrary meets.

Formally, a complete lattice L is said to be completely distributive if, for any doubly indexed family 
{xj,k | j in J, k in Kj} of L, we have
 
where F is the set of choice functions f choosing for each index j of J some index f(j) in Kj.

Complete distributivity is a self-dual property, i.e. dualizing the above statement yields the same class of complete lattices.

Without the axiom of choice, no complete lattice with more than one element can ever satisfy the above property, as one can just let xj,k equal the top element of L for all indices j and k with all of the sets Kj being nonempty but having no choice function.

Alternative characterizations

Various different characterizations exist. For example, the following is an equivalent law that avoids the use of choice functions. For any set S of sets, we define the set S# to be the set of all subsets X of the complete lattice that have non-empty intersection with all members of S. We then can define complete distributivity via the statement

 

The operator# might be called the crosscut operator. This version of complete distributivity only implies the original notion when admitting the Axiom of Choice.

Properties
In addition, it is known that the following statements are equivalent for any complete lattice L:

 L is completely distributive.
 L can be embedded into a direct product of chains [0,1] by an order embedding that preserves arbitrary meets and joins.
 Both L and its dual order Lop are continuous posets.

Direct products of [0,1], i.e. sets of all functions from some set X to [0,1] ordered pointwise, are also called cubes.

Free completely distributive lattices
Every poset C can be completed in a completely distributive lattice.

A completely distributive lattice L is called the free completely distributive lattice over a poset C if and only if there is an order embedding  such that for every completely distributive lattice M and monotonic function , there is a unique complete homomorphism  satisfying . For every poset C, the free completely distributive lattice over a poset C exists and is unique up to isomorphism.

This is an instance of the concept of free object. Since a set X can be considered as a poset with the discrete order, the above result guarantees the existence of the free completely distributive lattice over the set X.

Examples
 The unit interval [0,1], ordered in the natural way, is a completely distributive lattice.
More generally, any complete chain is a completely distributive lattice.
 The power set lattice  for any set X is a completely distributive lattice.
 For every poset C, there is a free completely distributive lattice over C. See the section on Free completely distributive lattices above.

See also
 Glossary of order theory
 Distributive lattice

References

Order theory